Javad Kazemian (born 23 April 1981 in Kashan, Iran) is an Iranian football winger. He is commonly mistaken for a striker as he is frequently involved in running towards the opposing box, but his preferred position is a right winger.

Club career
He started with the youth team of Saipa and was able to make it to the senior team. There he showed some great performances and was called up to the Iranian national team when Miroslav Blažević was Iran's manager. He joined Al-Ahli of UAE in 2002 with $300'000 deal, playing alongside Ali Karimi. but returned to Iran after a few months, briefly playing for Saipa again, and then three seasons with Persepolis FC.

After World Cup 2006, he signed a one-year loan deal with Emirati club Al-Shaab with the option to sign a permanent contract with the club after a year, but then signed a season-long contract with Al-Shabab club in the end of the league in 2007–2008 season.

In 2008, he went on loan to Ajman football club, following a series of poor performances with Al-Shabab. He had another average season with 17 matches and scoring just 6 goals for the club. He parted ways with Ajman in 2010, following two poor seasons with the club.
In 2010, he signed with Dubai club Emirates, avoiding a return to Iran.

He finally returned to Iran in 2010 and signed for Sepahan and won the league.

On 23 July 2011, despite rumors circulating that he has joined Foolad, he signed a contract with Persepolis and joined his beloved club. He extended his contract with Persepolis for one year, keeping him with the team through 2013, but his contract was terminated on 18 December 2012. At the end of the year, he joined Tractor where he made a good partnership with Mehdi Seyed Salehi and finished second in the league.

Club career statistics

 Assist Goals

International career
Having made his first appearance for the senior national team in January 2001 against China, Javad Kazemian was among the Iranian squad at the 2001 FIFA World Youth Championship in Argentina. He is known primarily for his goal against Japan in the final of the football tournament in the 2002 Asian Games in Busan, South Korea, winning a Gold medal with the Iran U-23 team. He was also a member of the World Cup 2006 squad that went to Germany, but he did not get a chance to play.

Having joined the national team once again in July 2007, he scored Iran's winning goal in its 2007 Asian Cup opening match against Uzbekistan.
He has been called up for 2010 FIFA World Cup Qualifying but like before he could not get the first eleven starting.

In 2009, he was called up to the national side after a one-year absence to play an international friendly against China.
He participated in the first round of group stages of 2014 FIFA World Cup qualification for Team Melli.

International goals
Scores and results list Iran's goal tally first.

Personal life
After scoring goals for his club, Kazemian sometimes pulls up his shirt to show a photo printed on the shirt underneath, which is of his brother who died in 2004.

Honours

Club
Al-Ahli
UAE President's Cup: 2001–02

Al-Shabab
UAE Pro League: 2007–08

Emirates
UAE President Cup: 2009–10
UAE Super Cup: 2010

Sepahan
Iran Pro League: 2010–11

Tractor
Iran Pro League: 2012–13 (Runner-up)
Hazfi Cup: 2013–14

Country
Iran U-23
Asian Games Gold Medal: 2002

Notes

External links
Javad Kazemian official website

 Javad Kazemian at TeamMelli.com
 Javad Kazemian  at PersianLeague.com
 

1981 births
Living people
Iranian footballers
Iran under-20 international footballers
Iran international footballers
Association football wingers
Saipa F.C. players
Al Ahli Club (Dubai) players
Persepolis F.C. players
Tractor S.C. players
Saba players
2006 FIFA World Cup players
2007 AFC Asian Cup players
Al-Shaab CSC players
Ajman Club players
Al Shabab Al Arabi Club Dubai players
Iranian expatriate footballers
People from Kashan
Emirates Club players
Persian Gulf Pro League players
Azadegan League players
UAE Pro League players
Asian Games gold medalists for Iran
Asian Games medalists in football
Footballers at the 2002 Asian Games
Medalists at the 2002 Asian Games
21st-century Iranian people